Battle of Victoria may refer to:

Battle of Vitoria, Spain, 1813
One of two fictional battles during the Bloody Valentine War in the Mobile Suit Gundam SEED anime metaseries

See also
 Battle of La Victoria (disambiguation)